The Jungbu Expressway is an expressway in South Korea. Numbered 35, it connects Cheongju to Hanam. The expressway's route number is 35, which it shares with the Tongyeong–Daejeon Expressway. This expressway joins the Gyeongbu Expressway at Cheongju and they divide again at Daejeon.

History 
 April 1985 – Construction begins.
 December 1987 – Numbered 10, Gangil (East Seoul)-Nami segment opens to traffic.
 November 1991 – Gangil-Hanam segment transfers to Seoul Ring Expressway.
 August 2001 – Numbered 35, which it shares with the Tongyeong–Daejeon Expressway.
 November 2001 – New Majang-Sangok segment opens as Second Jungbu Expressway.

List of facilities 

 IC: Interchange, JC: Junction, SA: Service area, TG: Tollgate

See also
Tongyeong–Daejeon Expressway
Second Jungbu Expressway
Expressways in South Korea
Transport in South Korea

External links
 MOLIT South Korean Government Transport Department

Expressways in South Korea
Roads in North Chungcheong
Roads in Gyeonggi